Cysteine rich secretory protein LCCL domain containing 1 is a protein that in humans is encoded by the CRISPLD1 gene.

References

Further reading 

Extracellular matrix proteins